Laings is an unincorporated community in central Green Township, Monroe County, Ohio, United States.  It has a post office with the ZIP code 43752.  It lies along State Route 255.

References

Unincorporated communities in Ohio
Unincorporated communities in Monroe County, Ohio